Ziridava kanshireiensis is a moth in the family Geometridae. It is found in Taiwan and on the Philippines, Borneo and Peninsular Malaysia.

References

Moths described in 1958
Eupitheciini
Moths of Borneo